This is a list of districts (dzongkhag) of Bhutan by Human Development Index as of 2021.

References 

Bhutan
Human Development Index
Districts by Human Development Index